Eilhard is a masculine German given name. Notable people with the name include:

Eilhard Lubinus (1565–1621), German Lutheran theologian and philosopher
Eilhard Mitscherlich (1794–1863), German chemist
Eilhard Wiedemann (1852–1928), German physicist and historian of science

German masculine given names